Katerine Montealegre Navarro (born 1993) is a Chilean lawyer who was elected as a member of the Chilean Constitutional Convention.

References

Living people
1993 births
Chilean women lawyers
21st-century Chilean politicians
Santo Tomás University alumni
Members of the Chilean Constitutional Convention
21st-century Chilean women politicians
21st-century Chilean lawyers